Rah is an album by American jazz drummer Billy Hart recorded in 1987 and released on the Gramavision label.

Reception
The Allmusic review by Michael G. Nastos awarded the album 3 stars stating "Excellent original compositions. This is very listenable, time after time. Many great soloists and ensemble players. Highly recommended".

Track listing
All compositions by Billy Hart except as indicated
 "Motional" (Mark Grey, Billy Hart) - 4:48    
 "Reflections" (Kevin Eubanks) - 6:08    
 "Naaj" - 7:13    
 "Breakup" (Bill Frisell) - 5:11    
 "Reneda" - 5:53    
 "Reminder" (Frisell) - 6:23    
 "Dreams" (Eddie Henderson) - 7:08    
 "Junque" (David Liebman) - 7:45

Personnel
Billy Hart - drums
Dave Liebman - soprano saxophone  
Caris Visentin - oboe (track 8)
Eddie Henderson - flugelhorn  
Ralph Moore - tenor saxophone (tracks 1 & 3-7) 
Kevin Eubanks (tracks 1-3, 6 & 7), Bill Frisell (tracks 1 & 3-8) - guitar  
Mark Gray  - synthesizer (tracks 1-3, 5 & 8)
Kenny Kirkland - piano  
Eddie Gómez (tracks 1, 4, 6 & 8), Buster Williams (tracks 2, 3, 5 & 7) - bass

References

Gramavision Records albums
Billy Hart albums
1988 albums